Jubilation "Jubilee" Lee is a character appearing in American comic books published by Marvel Comics. Created by writer Chris Claremont and artist Marc Silvestri, the character first appeared in Uncanny X-Men #244 (May 1989). Jubilee is a member of the human subspecies known as mutants, born with superhuman abilities. She can generate pyrotechnic energy blasts from her hands. Introduced as an orphaned "mall rat" from Beverly Hills, Jubilee joined the X-Men in the early 1990s, becoming the team's youngest member and often playing a sidekick role to her father-figure, Wolverine.

Jubilee eventually joined the junior team Generation X, and was a prominent character in the 1990s X-Men animated series. In late 2004, Marvel launched a self-titled six-part limited series for Jubilee set in Los Angeles, written by Robert Kirkman. In early 2011, she appeared in the four-part limited series Wolverine and Jubilee, written by Kathryn Immonen.

Jubilee was one of many mutants who lost their powers in the 2005 storyline "Decimation"; she later reappeared using technology-based powers, using the alias Wondra, in the New Warriors comic book series. During the 2010 "Curse of the Mutants" storyline, she was turned into a vampire. She became a single mother after adopting a son, Shogo, in a 2013 storyline. She was eventually, in 2019, cured of her vampirism and had her mutant powers restored by a shard of the Phoenix Force.

Jubilee has cameo appearances in the first three X-Men films, portrayed by Katrina Florece in the first film, and by Kea Wong in its two sequels. In the 2016 film X-Men: Apocalypse, she was portrayed by Lana Condor.

Publication history
Jubilee was created by writer Chris Claremont and artist Marc Silvestri and first appeared in The Uncanny X-Men #244 (May 1989). Claremont had earlier introduced a "Jubilee" of sorts in The New Mutants Annual #2 (1986). In that story, Darla of the Fat Boys, after being mentally and biologically warped, uses identical powers to those of the later Jubilation Lee and introduces herself as "Jubilee! Whose every move is a celebration!" In her first appearance Jubilation Lee gives a similar self-introduction: "Actually, my name is Jubilee! 'Cause with me, every day's a celebration!" Darla is returned to normal by the end of The New Mutants Annual #2, and no in-story connection between the characters is ever established.

Jubilee appeared regularly as an X-Men team member in The Uncanny X-Men through issue #280 (Sept. 1991), and later was a staple of X-Men (1991) as a member of the X-Men's Blue Team. During the same timeframe, she also served as Wolverine's sidekick in Wolverine vol. 2 #40–75 (1991–1993).

After the Phalanx Covenant storyline in X-Men #16–17 and The Uncanny X-Men #316–317, Jubilee, who was then a teenager, was transferred to the X-Men trainee squad Generation X and starred in the entire run of Generation X #1–75 (1994–2001). After the dissolution of Generation X, Jubilee returned to the pages of The Uncanny X-Men, first as a member of the X-Corporation (#403–406, 2002), and later as a team member in her own right (#423–437, 2003–2004). Jubilee had a six-issue self-titled limited series in 2004 written by Robert Kirkman, but loses her mutant powers in House of M – The Day After #1 (Jan. 2006). She then adopts the alias Wondra and joins the reconstituted New Warriors in New Warriors vol. 4 #1–20 (2007–2009).

Jubilee is affected with vampirism during the "Curse of the Mutants" in X-Men vol. 3 #1 (July 2010) and remained a sporadic character on that title through issue #27 (April 2012), as well as a supporting character in X-23 vol. 3 (2010–2011). In 2011, she saw print in her second four issue limited series, Wolverine and Jubilee written by Kathryn Immonen and drawn by Phil Noto, as an aftermath follow-up to the Curse of the Mutants storyline. Jubilee later featured as a regular character in the all-female X-Men vol. 4 #1–25 (2013–2015), and as a supporting character in Patsy Walker, a.k.a. Hellcat! (2016). She returned as a main cast member in Generation X vol. 2 #1-9, #85-87 (2017-2018) as the adult mentor to the new teenage main characters, during which she was cured of vampirism and had her mutant powers restored.

Fictional character biography

Origins
The daughter of two prosperous Chinese immigrants, Jubilation "Jubilee" Lee was born in Beverly Hills, California, where she lived with her wealthy parents. An immensely talented gymnast, she was believed to have the potential to participate in the Olympic Games. This life was destroyed when her parents were murdered by the hitmen Reno and Molokai.

Jubilee was sent to an orphanage but ran away and hid in the Hollywood Mall, stealing food to survive. She discovered her mutant power to generate blinding and explosive energy blasts (herself referring to them as "fireworks") while running away from mall security. The stress of fleeing security guards caused Jubilee to emit a large light energy blast in a back alley. This disoriented the men and allowed her to escape. Learning about her mutant ability, she realized she could earn money by using it to entertain customers in the mall.

The mall security attempted to put an end to her unauthorized performances, but she continued to elude them. They hired the M-Squad, a company of professional mutant hunters, to capture her. Jubilee was rescued by X-Men members Dazzler, Psylocke, Rogue, and Storm. Curious about the women, she tracked them to the portal leading back to their base in the Outback and stepped through.

Jubilee stays hidden in the base, never having heard of the X-Men and has no idea how they might react to her presence. She steals food and borrows clothes from several of the X-Men to create a makeshift costume for herself. She is attacked by a cybernetic dog, and forced to use her powers in self-defense by blowing up the beast. This is the first time Jubilee learns her powers can do real damage, although a later retcon has her first manifestation causing destruction on a similar scale.

While sneaking around the caverns in the Outback base, Jubilee witnesses the X-Man Wolverine being captured and tortured by the Reavers. Jubilee is terrified of the Reavers, but unable to convince herself to abandon a fellow human being to such suffering. During a respite from the torture sessions, Jubilee helps Wolverine back to her hiding spot in the complex, where she nurses him back to health. Before entirely recovered, Wolverine and Jubilee are forced to abandon their sanctuary when the Reavers hunt them down. The pair make their way to Madripoor where they battle the Mandarin and Matsu'o Tsurayaba's Hand. Jubilee holds her own against the highly skilled Hand, and blows up part of the Mandarin's castle with her powers when she, along with Wolverine and Psylocke, is taken prisoner.

Afterward, Jubilee teams up with Wolverine on several of his missions throughout the world. She does not handle traveling well, as she desires American food and luxuries. She helps Wolverine in battle when he becomes involved with well-intentioned but violent mercenaries.

Alongside Wolverine and Psylocke, Jubilee battles Hardcase and the Harriers. She also meets the Black Widow and participates in a mission to rescue several kidnapped New Mutants from Genosha. Against her protests, Wolverine places her in charge of looking after Boom Boom and Rictor and meeting up with X-Factor. The three survive on the streets of the island nation before meeting up with the other X-Men. After meeting the X-Men, she travels with them to the Shi'ar Empire, but is captured by the Warskrulls. She briefly falls under the control of the Shadow King, along with the X-Men and numerous others.

Wolverine and the X-Men
Wolverine brings Jubilee to Professor Xavier at the X-Mansion, who welcomes the girl with open arms. She and Wolverine develop a close father-daughter relationship with one another. Due to this relationship, Jubilee is referred to as Wolverine's unofficial sidekick.

Jubilee finds a home with the X-Men and joins the X-Men Blue Team. She aids her fellow mutants in battles against Omega Red, the Shi'ar Empire, Skrulls, and the Brood, among others. With the last three, she holds her own against many powerful entities, often being the vital factor in saving fellow X-Men and/or innocent civilians. She forms close bonds with many of the team members, taking piggyback rides with Beast as she enjoys his leaping abilities. When Professor Xavier temporarily regains the use of his legs, she takes him rollerblading. She has the chance to talk about Wolverine with Shadowcat, who had been in her sidekick role before, and bonds with the younger Illyana Rasputin. Jubilee later mourns the loss of Illyana with the rest of the X-Men, especially Jean Grey.

Alongside the X-Men, Jubilee is captured by Omega Red, Matsu'o Tsuryaba, and Fenris. She also fights Sabretooth during this encounter. Alongside Wolverine, she then clashes with Mojo (see Abcissa), and is arrested in Tokyo for speeding and driving without a license. There she meets Yukio, and teams with her against Cylla Markham. She aids the X-Men and Ghost Rider against the Brood. Jubilee then journeys with the X-Men to Mojoworld.

During one adventure, Jubilee falls halfway through a time portal and witnesses the moment when hitmen arrived at her home to kill her parents. Knowing the names and faces of her parents' murderers for the first time, Jubilee sets out to kill them, but Wolverine talks her out of it. Shortly after, Wolverine leaves the X-Men. He does not give Jubilee the option to come with him, instead leaving her a note which repeatedly emphasizes that she should stick with Professor Xavier and not go out on her own again. Though she maintains her usual spunky demeanor in the ensuing weeks, the other X-Men notice that she feels somewhat abandoned by Wolverine's leaving.

Generation X
Jubilee leaves the X-Men to join a new group of teenage mutants known as Generation X. The team is led by Banshee and Emma Frost, and is initially composed of Jubilee, Husk, Synch, M, and Skin, with Chamber, Penance, Mondo, and Gaia joining as the series progresses. The team also becomes a safe haven for three young wards during their adventures: Artie Maddicks, Leech, and temporarily, Franklin Richards.

Both Banshee and Emma Frost educate the teenagers in school subjects as well as combat and field skills (with occasional assistance from visiting instructors such as Wolverine and Beast). Jubilee and the other mutant teens hone their unique abilities and occasionally battle foes such as the Juggernaut, Omega Red, and their archrival Emplate. Time after time, Jubilee uses her experience with the X-Men to help her teammates outsmart their enemies. On more than one occasion, Jubilee is solely responsible for the defeat of Emplate. She uses sarcasm when Emplate siphons her powers so that he will become enraged enough to not have control over them, causing him to blast himself with Jubilee's energy blasts. During the team's last encounter with Emplate, Jubilee uses her power to blow up Proudstar Hall in order to defeat him. Her teammates survive the massive explosion because Iceman covers them with an ice shield.

During her stay at the Massachusetts Academy, Jubilee is kidnapped and held hostage by Bastion during Operation: Zero Tolerance. She manages to resist his mental probes for a good amount of time, hiding valuable information about the X-Men. Jubilee stages an escape early on, knocking several armed soldiers unconscious with a large plasma volley. However, she is recaptured when she stops to give CPR to one of the guards she injured. She eventually escapes with the help of Bastion's assistant, Daria. While wandering the desert after her getaway, she is attacked by a Prime Sentinel and holds her own by blasting his vision receptors. She is saved at the last minute by Wolverine, who reunites her with the X-Men. After discovering Bastion has planted a nano-explosive inside Cyclops, the X-Men return home, dropping Jubilee off at Massachusetts Academy on the way.

One of the most important episodes of her stay with Generation X comes when she discovers the true killer of her parents, Hunter Brawn. She stages an operation, using her mutant powers, and innate skills and abilities to track down Brawn. With the help of her friends and teammates, she manages to defeat him. Enraged at how he destroyed her family, Jubilee's powers flare to a massive level, but instead of killing the man, she takes out her aggression by blowing up his warehouse, leaving him to be arrested by local authorities.

After Generation X
After Generation X disbands, Jubilee moves to Los Angeles with her former teammate Skin to pursue an acting career. She is cast in nothing but stereotypical Asian roles, and after her agent tries to seduce her, she hits him with a powerful energy blast.

Around the same time, Jubilee is offered a position on Banshee's militaristic X-Corps team, alongside former teammates Husk and M. The three young women hesitantly join Banshee in order to keep an eye on him. During her run with the X-Corps, Jubilee holds off an uprising in Paris by blinding hostile enemies. Jubilee and Husk, with the help of Stacy X, also manage to take down the Blob and rescue Banshee from Mystique.

After her time in the X-Corps, Jubilee returns to Los Angeles with Skin, but the two (along with Magma and other mutants) are kidnapped and crucified on the front lawn of the X-Mansion by the Church of Humanity. Jubilee, Magma, and the others recover from the attack thanks to Angel's healing blood, but Skin is not so fortunate. Jubilee becomes depressed due to the loss of her friend, and reunites with Husk. The two, along with Angel, attend Skin's funeral. Since the gravekeeper would not allow a mutant to be buried in his cemetery, he has Skin cremated and hands Jubilee the ashes. Afterward, Jubilee goes on a few missions with Nightcrawler and Havok's Uncanny X-Men team, but is taken off the active roster when Cyclops decides she needs a mental break.

While inactive, Jubilee is contacted by a long lost relative, her aunt Hope. Hope decides to adopt Jubilee and take her into her home in Los Angeles, which gives Jubilee a much-needed break from X-Mansion life. Jubilee attends Payton Noble High School and becomes a peer advisor. She gets into a few fights at school, and is reprimanded because of her power display. She also befriends a mutant named Shane Shooter, and helps him take down a gang leader. Unfortunately for Jubilee, her aunt is caught in a crime ring, as she was an assassin. While Wolverine is visiting Jubilee, the two of them – along with Hope (and her butler Brad) – get into a battle with Hope's former boss. Hope is caught in a violent explosion and seemingly dies (she is later revealed to have been thrown afar by the explosion, revealing her cybernetic nature), causing a distraught Jubilee to move back to the X-Mansion with Wolverine, where she is seen celebrating Christmas.

Decimation and aftermath
Jubilee is revealed to have lost her powers on M-Day, due to the reality-altering powers of the Scarlet Witch. She returns to New York shortly after running a half-way house for depowered mutants in Queens, New York, and is kidnapped by Omega Red and his henchmen while Wolverine is sidetracked during the battle. She is taken to Berlin as a hostage. Wolverine manages to use S.H.I.E.L.D. to find Jubilee, but she is beaten and badly injured. Logan trades his freedom from S.H.I.E.L.D. for Jubilee's safety and well-being. She is carried away in a medical unit by S.H.I.E.L.D. operatives.

Jubilee next resurfaces as Wondra, the second-in-command of one of the incarnations of the New Warriors. She uses technologically based super-strength (supplied by what appears to be a variation of The Wizard's "Wonder Gauntlets") capable of lifting a locomotive engine over her head. Recruited as the first member, Jubilee takes a more serious attitude to her role as Wondra and serves alongside fellow X-Men and former teammates Decibel and Stacy X. Jubilee distrusts Night Thrasher and uncovers evidence that he is using the team for less than noble reasons, and after a trip to the future, the former mutants leave the team in the hands of ex-members of the Initiative (Slapstick, Justice, Ultra Girl, et al.).

After leaving the New Warriors, she returns to San Francisco and meets with a group of young mutants her age, who tell her about Utopia, the island home for mutants. Jubilee reaffirms her identity as a mutant, despite being depowered, but still declines to join the X-Men on Utopia.

Curse of the Mutants
Cyclops sends Pixie to check on Jubilee, and while the girls are chatting, Jubilee is one of many individuals to be mass-infected with a bio-engineered virus by a vampire suicide bomber. Jubilee is taken to the X-Men's headquarters, where they run tests on her, confirming that the virus is slowly but surely transforming her into a vampire, making her less and less able to handle sunlight. Meanwhile, others infected by the virus quickly turn into full vampires and begin enacting the plans of the mysterious "Lord of Vampires".

Later, while talking to Doctor Nemesis (James Bradley), Jubilee reveals that something is calling for her, to which Doctor Nemesis tells her to fight it back. Jubilee eventually tells him that she does not want to fight. Much later, while the X-Men gather to discuss the death of Dracula and learn who the new Lord of Vampires is, Dr. Kavita Rao is seen checking on her, only to be attacked. Wolverine then feeds her some of his blood, since his healing factor keeps her from becoming savage. It is also revealed that Rockslide has a crush on Jubilee and follows her and Wolverine to Siberia to save her from a vampire cult.

Jubilee leaves Utopia to go see Xarus, who bites her. It is also revealed that Xarus only wants Jubilee so the X-Men can come to rescue her and fall into a trap, especially Wolverine. Jubilee is successfully transformed into a vampire and temporarily does the same to Wolverine after he comes to rescue her. She remains a vampire and is detained in a holding cell beneath Utopia for observation, with Cyclops and Wolverine both rejecting Blade's suggestion that killing her is the only solution.

Touching Darkness
At Gambit's behest, Wolverine travels to Paris, taking Jubilee with him. The tensions between Jubilee and X-23 (who is traveling with Gambit) flare up. Meanwhile, Gambit talks to Wolverine about the difference between how he treats Jubilee and X-23, both of whom see him as a father-figure. Jubilee soon starts to develop a friendship with X-23 due to their similar circumstances, with the latter helping her deal with her urges to kill, while Jubilee in turn helps Laura learn how to be a "normal" girl. She is later taken in by a group of vampires called the Forgiven, who have learned to move beyond their need for blood and can move about in the day, as a student.

Marvel NOW!
Jubilee returns to the X-Men with an orphaned baby, whom she names Shogo, who was infected with Arkea. During the Battle of the Atom event, Sentinel X (a member of the future X-Men) is revealed to be a fully grown Shogo. The two spend some quality time together after the death of the future Jubilee and the defeat of the Brotherhood of Mutants. Afterward, Storm informs her that the adoption papers have gone through, legally making Jubilee the mother of Shogo.

Reverting to a mutant
Jubilee becomes a teacher at the newly-renamed Xavier Institute, mentoring students deemed unsuited to become either X-Men or mutant ambassadors to humanity. Students under her supervision include Quentin Quire, Bling!, Nature Girl, Eye-Boy, Benjamin Deeds and Nathaniel Carver.

After Monet falls under the influence of her brother, Emplate, and attacks the school, she fights Jubilee and takes away the medallion she uses as protection from sunlight. Monet then threw her out of the school and as the sunlight began burning Jubilee, Quentin Quire sacrifices the shard of the Phoenix Force he carried within him to save her from certain death, curing Jubilee of her vampirism and restoring her mutant powers in the process.

Powers and abilities

Mutant powers
As a mutant, Jubilee has the power to generate pyrotechnic energy plasmoids from her hands. She has referred to these blasts as "fireworks." The plasmoids obeyed her mental control, traveling where she directed them, arranging themselves in various shapes, and exploding when she wished. The strength of the blasts varied in degrees of power and intensity, and can range from a multitude of colorful sparkles capable of temporarily blinding a person, to a powerful detonation capable of smashing objects and destroying property, or a precision burst inside a human brain, simulating the effects of a massive stroke. Jubilee can also absorb the energy back into her own body without harm.

While training in Generation X, Emma Frost described Jubilee as having the untapped ability to detonate matter at a subatomic level, which in theory is the equivalent of a nuclear fusion bomb. Her moral stance on taking a life was observed by Emma during the Phalanx Covenant, when Jubilee explained her fear of killing someone should her powers ever flare up again, as they did during the Acts of Vengeance storyline in The Uncanny X-Men (she destroyed the Mandarin's mansion in a massive explosion, out of grief after believing that Wolverine had been killed). Emma stated that Jubilee had unlimited potential and was one of the most powerful mutants she had ever encountered, being able to detonate matter at a sub-atomic level. Jubilee's Age of Apocalypse alternate had few qualms about using her powers, and made liberal use of her full ability. In X-Terminators, Jubilee makes good on all of Emma's speculations as she releases an Atom Bomb attack that completely destroys the Collector's spaceship (while also vaporizing her own clothes and all of the hair on her body).

Jubilee also displayed an immunity to telepathy, allowing her to remain "invisible" to telepaths. She had, on occasion, used this ability to hide herself from telepathic scans and to block mental probes from Sentinels.

In the aftermath of House of M, Jubilee was one of the many mutants to be depowered, but she has since regained her powers.

As Wondra
Jubilee was among the mutants depowered by M-Day. She fell into a deep depression following the loss of her powers, going through several jobs before joining the New Warriors. During this time, she was known by the alias "Wondra".

Upon joining the post-Civil War New Warriors team, Wondra gained highly advanced technology from Night Thrasher to replace her mutant abilities, giving her superhuman strength. While the upper limits of this power were not explored, the technology allowed Wondra to lift the engine of a freight train over her head. Wondra's power suit and gauntlets also enhanced her with limited invulnerability, as well as the ability to fly with hover discs.

Vampire abilities
Jubilee gained the powers of a vampire from her transformation by the bite of Xarus, the son of Dracula. They include superhuman strength and speed, and turning into vapor. It is possible that she can heal much faster than a human. As a vampire, Jubilee now possesses all of the weaknesses of a vampire. She uses a medallion created by Xarus which allows all vampires to endure the sunlight. Quentin Quire later apparently cured Jubilee from her vampiric status after using a shard of the Phoenix Force he carried to save her from certain death, restoring her mutant powers in the process.

Innate traits and abilities
Jubilee is a talented gymnast and in-line skater. While living on her own, she used her skills to evade capture while stealing to survive, first from the various shops in the mall and later at the X-Men's Australian base. She has also displayed above average hand-to-hand combat skills, having learned street-fighting techniques while in Los Angeles County Juvenile Hall, and being coached further by Wolverine. Her skills are sufficient to survive combat with the Hand. She also demonstrated strong leadership abilities, often being placed in a field commander role by Banshee during her closing time with Generation X, and acting as a drill-sergeant figure for the most recent New Warriors team.

In an issue of the Wolverine comic series, it was stated that Jubilee suffers from dyscalculia.

Reception

Critical reception 
Deirdre Kaye of Scary Mommy called Sabra a "role model" and "truly heroic." Andy Quach of MovieWeb included Jubilee in their "Asian Comic Book Characters that Need to Hit the MCU and DCU" list and called her one of the "most storied Asian heroes in all comic book history," writing, "Her character has been through plenty of thrilling storylines in the X-Men comics, any of which could make for an entertaining origin story centered around her."

George Marston of Newsarama included Jubilee in their "20 X-Men characters that should make the jump from Marvel comics to the MCU" list. John Grimaldi of Collider included Jubilee in their "10 Strongest Superhero Sidekicks in Marvel Comics" list. Darren Franich of Entertainment Weekly ranked Jubilee 25th in their "Let's rank every X-Man ever" list. Matthew Perpetua of BuzzFeed ranked Jubilee 28th in their "95 X-Men Members Ranked From Worst To Best" list. CBR.com ranked Jubilee 9th in their "10 Smartest Marvel Sidekicks" list, and ranked her 20th in their "20 Most Powerful Mutants From The '80s" list.

Literary reception

Volumes

Jubilee - 2004 
According to Diamond Comic Distributors, Jubilee #1 was the 80th best selling comic book in September 2004.

Wolverine and Jubilee - 2011 
According to Marvel Comics, Wolverine and Jubilee #1 sold out. According to Diamond Comic Distributors, Wolverine and Jubilee #1 was the 70th best selling comic book in January 2011.

Greg McElhatton of CBR.com called Wolverine and Jubilee #1 a "smart-looking book," writing, "I'm curious to see where Immonen and Noto are going to take it from here. There's a lot of set-up in this first issue, but it's such a pleasant set-up that you barely even notice until it's over. So far, my only real complaint is that we're getting this as a mini-series. Of all the 9000 other X-Men spin-offs out there, one with this creative team would sure be nice."

Other versions

Abcissa
In one alternate timeline, Mojo tried to stop the Big Crunch, the end of time and collapse of all matter which would start a new Big Bang. Jubilee told him to stop, and she would be his slave. Giving her the new name "Abcissa", her powers would be altered to animate and control the many chains that were attached to her body. Abcissa and Mojo kidnapped Jubilee, taking her to the Crunch, so she would become Mojo's slave. Jubilee refused, which nullified Abcissa's existence. Wolverine arrived and defeated Mojo.

Age of Apocalypse
In the Age of Apocalypse, Jubilee is part of Gambit's X-Ternals, a group of rebel thieves. She went with the X-Ternals to the Shi'ar Empire in order to steal a piece of the M'Kraan Crystal. Jubilee displayed a greater level of control over her power than her Marvel-616 version by detonating the clothing of several Madri enforcers on a molecular level. In addition, she uses the full extent of her powers by destroying a Shi'ar ship single-handedly. Her fate in the tenth anniversary issue of the Age of Apocalypse is not revealed.

Amazing Spider-Man: Renew Your Vows
In this continuity, Jubilee is an instructor at Xavier's School for Gifted Children, but is revealed to be a double agent working for Magneto.

Amalgam Comics
In this alternate universe, where part of the Marvel multiverse is fused with part of the DC multiverse, Jubilee is combined with Robin to become Sparrow, the sidekick of Dark Claw (Wolverine + Batman).

Days of Future Past
In Days of Future Past, Jubilee is one of the last X-Men alive and among the few mutants who are not prisoners in a concentration camp. She lives with her lover Synch in the ruins of Hollywood.

DC vs. Marvel
In the 1996 Marvel/DC crossover series DC vs. Marvel storyline, Jubilee first meets Robin when he suddenly appears in her room. She starts admiring his costume and eventually develops an attraction to him. The two are later transported to a warehouse and before they begin their fight, Jubilee kisses Robin. While Jubilee has the upper hand, Robin uses a sneak attack and wins without hitting her. Robin and Jubilee suddenly end up in Venice, and while they do not know how, neither cares, and soon they start a relationship. With the universe restored and the heroes and villains returned to their respective universe, Jubilee becomes upset that she will never see Robin again. However, she is later briefly reunited with him in the follow-up Age of Amalgam Marvel/DC crossover series.

MC2
In MC2, Jubilee is the leader of a team of mutant heroes called the X-People. She was also part of A-Next, a future generation of Avengers. However, Jubilee preferred to act on her own and only reluctantly cooperates with other heroes. She apparently still retains a reserve status with the Avengers, and has joined them on several occasions. She can sporadically be seen in the Spider-Girl series and related miniseries.

Mutant X
In Mutant X, Jubilee is the leader of the villain team the Marauders, consisting of Sunspot, Wolfsbane, Cannonball, and Husk, although she has trouble keeping her team under control. After the Marauders fought with Bloodstorm, Jubilee was severely hurt.

Team X
Team X was a brief one-shot featuring Bishop and Deathbird. It featured Jubilee in a green bodysuit (codenamed Vertigo) from roughly fifteen years into the future. Vertigo was a part of a resistance movement against Shi'ar Majestrix Alanna, the maniacal daughter of Lilandra Neramani and Professor Xavier. This version of Jubilee possesses several light-based powers including making light knives, firing photon beams, and turning invisible.

Ultimate Marvel
Ultimate Jubilee is a member of Alpha Flight, first appearing in Ultimate X-Men #94. The team overpowers the X-Men during their game of baseball against the Academy of Tomorrow and kidnaps Northstar, claiming that he belongs with them. Her powers and appearance seem not to differ greatly from her Earth-616 counterpart, as well as her laid back personality during and after the battle. She is a fan of Dazzler. She is such a fan that she planned to get Dazzler's autograph and wore one of her band's shirts when they attacked, much to the annoyance of her team, especially Snowbird.

Secret Wars
During the Secret Wars storyline, Jubilee appeared as a member of the Runaways, and is a high school student at the Victor von Doom Institute for Gifted Youths in the Battleworld domain of Doomstadt. She is the leader of a gang-type group called The Night Witches along with Delphyne Gorgon and Pixie. It is unknown whether she is a vampire or not in this reality.

In other media

Television

 Jubilee appears in X-Men: The Animated Series, voiced by Alyson Court. This version lived with a foster family before she was recruited into the X-Men by Cyclops and formed bonds with several of her teammates, such as Gambit and Wolverine. In the series' final episodes, she is redesigned to resemble her Generation X appearance.
 Jubilee appears in the Spider-Man episodes "The Mutant Agenda" and "Mutants' Revenge", voiced again by Alyson Court.
 Jubilee appears in X-Men: Evolution, voiced by Chiara Zanni. This version is a member of the X-Men's junior team, the New Mutants, who displays no connection to Wolverine and is not homeless. After being written out of the third season, a vision of the future reveals she eventually returns to the X-Men.

Film

 Jubilee appears in Generation X, portrayed by Heather McComb.
 Jubilee makes a cameo appearance in X-Men, portrayed by Katrina Florece. This version is a contemporary student of the Xavier Institute under Charles Xavier and Storm. While she goes unnamed, Jubilee is identified as such in a deleted scene.
 Jubilee makes a cameo appearance in X2, portrayed by Kea Wong. She is among the kidnapped students that General William Stryker captures during his raid of the Xavier Institute before Storm and Nightcrawler rescue them.
 Jubilee makes a cameo appearance in X-Men: The Last Stand, portrayed again by Kea Wong.
 Concept art for X-Men: Days of Future Past reveal Jubilee, based on Jamie Chung's likeness, was considered to appear in the film.
 Jubilee appears in X-Men: Apocalypse, portrayed by Lana Condor. This version is a student of the Xavier Institute from 1983. Additionally, she was meant to play a larger role, but most of her scenes were cut from the theatrical version and later included as deleted scenes in the subsequent home releases. Condor also appears as her character in a fake TV commercial for the Xavier school.

Video games
 Jubilee appears as an assist character in Marvel vs. Capcom: Clash of Super Heroes, voiced again by Alyson Court.
 Jubilee makes a cameo appearance in Wolverine.
 Jubilee appears as an unlockable playable character in X-Men Legends, voiced by Danica McKellar.
 Jubilee appears in Marvel Heroes, voiced by Aly Casas.
 Jubilee appears as a playable character in Marvel Future Fight.
 Jubilee appears as a playable character in Marvel Super War.
 Jubilee appears as a playable character in Marvel Puzzle Quest.
 Jubilee appears as a playable character in Marvel Strike Force.
 Jubilee appears in Marvel Snap.

Miscellaneous

 Jubilee appears in the novelization for X2. Amidst General William Stryker's raid of the Xavier Institute, she absorbs a taser's electricity and blasts one of Stryker's men through a wall, but is ultimately captured. While in captivity, she rallies her fellow captured students before they are rescued.

Collected editions

See also
 List of Marvel Comics characters

References

External links
 Jubilee at Marvel.com

Characters created by Chris Claremont
Characters created by Marc Silvestri
Chinese-American superheroes
Comics characters introduced in 1989
Fictional characters from Beverly Hills, California
Fictional characters who can manipulate light
Fictional Chinese American people
Marvel Comics child superheroes
Marvel Comics female superheroes
Marvel Comics film characters
Marvel Comics mutants
Marvel Comics orphans
Marvel Comics sidekicks
Marvel Comics vampires
Vampire superheroes
Wolverine (comics) characters
X-Men members